is a passenger railway station  located in the city of Odawara, Kanagawa Prefecture, Japan, operated by the private railway company Odakyu Electric Railway.

Lines
Ashigara Station is served by the Odakyu Odawara Line, and is located 80.8 kilometers from the line’s terminus at Shinjuku Station.

Station layout
Ashigara Station has two island platforms and three tracks, connected to the station building by a footbridge.

Platforms

History
Ashigara Station was opened on 1 April 1927.

Station numbering was introduced in January 2014 with Ashigara being assigned station number OH46.

Passenger statistics
In fiscal 2019, the station was used by an average of 3,893 passengers daily.

The passenger figures for previous years are as shown below.

Surrounding area
 Odawara City Hall
 Odawara Municipal Hospital
 Odawara Police Station
 Ogicho Post Office

See also
List of railway stations in Japan

References

External links

Odakyu station information 

Railway stations in Kanagawa Prefecture
Railway stations in Japan opened in 1927
Odakyu Odawara Line
Railway stations in Odawara